Babouche is a surname. Notable people with the surname include:

Réda Babouche (born 1979), Algerian footballer
Yacine Babouche (born 1978), Algerian footballer

See also
Aïn Babouche, a town and commune in Oum El Bouaghi Province, Algeria

Surnames of Algerian origin